= Ricardo Medina Fierro =

Mexican politician (born 1975)

- Born: 5 August 1975 (age 50); Mexicali, Baja California, Mexico
- Occupation: Deputy
- Political party: PRI

Ricardo Medina Fierro (born 5 August 1975) is a Mexican politician affiliated with the PRI. He served as Deputy of the LXII Legislature of the Mexican Congress representing Baja California from 2012 to 2015.
